Steve Lambert is an American artist (born  1976) who works with issues of advertising and the use of public space. He is a founder of the Anti-Advertising Agency, an artist-run initiative which critiques advertising through artistic interventions, and of the Budget Gallery (with Cynthia Burgess) which creates exhibitions by painting over outdoor advertisements and hanging submitted art in its place. Lambert's artistic practice includes drawing, performance, intervention, culture jamming, public art, video, and internet art. He has worked with the Graffiti Research Lab, Glowlab, and as a senior fellow at Eyebeam.

Lambert is a member of the New York based artist group Free Art and Technology Lab. He has won several awards including from Turbulence, the Creative Work Fund, Rhizome/The New Museum, Adbusters Media Foundation, and the California Arts Council.

Biography
Steve Lambert was born in Los Angeles in 1976. He and his family moved to the San Francisco Bay Area four days later. His father was a former Franciscan friar, and his mother, an ex-Dominican nun. He dropped out of high school in 1993, but went on to study sociology and film, receiving a BFA from the San Francisco Art Institute in 2000, and an MFA at the University of California, Davis in 2006. He teaches at SUNY Purchase.

Projects

The Budget Gallery
Before creating the "Anti-Advertising Agency", Lambert founded The Budget Gallery with the help of several others. The Budget Gallery is a non-profit organization that works to set up art galleries in public spaces, such as vacant walls and fences, located throughout the city of choice. An effort is put forth beforehand to publicize and prepare the shows, and such shows are often accompanied by "hundreds". The goal of such shows is to "bring art into public spaces that need diverse messages expressing emotion and depicting issues that represent the depth and breadth of humanity."

The Budget Gallery allows and encourages people to organize an outdoor guerrilla art gallery in their own town. They provide a how-to manual for how to choose a place, make calls, and sell art for the gallery.

Add-Art
Lambert has made a free Firefox plugin, called Add-Art which replaces ads with art in conjunction with the Firefox Plugin Adblock Plus. The artwork used in the plug-in is from contemporary artists that curators set up and each show is shown for two weeks. There is also information about the current artist and curator for each selection of art pieces displayed. All of the art submitted has the opportunity to be displayed in the bimonthly exhibit.

Adblock is supported by a small website that also contains information on the current artists and curators, as well as a schedule of past and upcoming AddArt shows. Every two weeks, 5 to 8 artists are selected by emerging and established curators. Images used have to be cropped in order to fit properly in the banner space.

Self Control
In 2009, Steve developed "Self Control" at the Eyebeam Center for Art and Technology. The application, which is open source and licensed under the GPL, was developed for Mac OS X to block access to incoming and outgoing mail servers, as well as websites for a specified period of time. The application acts as a tool to remove the temptation to access sources of distraction to those who have trouble with self-control. Steve came up with the idea from his own personal experiences with being distracted on the internet. This would help him, as an artist, to block out outside stimuli in order to get focused work done. Once the timer has been started, the process cannot be undone.

Why They Hate US
In 2006 Steve Lambert, with the help of Steve Calderon, launched Why They Hate US. The project invited users to tag photos on Flickr with "whytheyhateus", acting as a display of pictures that users suggest contribute to a negative view of the United States or have the potential to be misinterpreted as negative. Some of the themes include gun violence, war, crude humor, consumerism, obesity, and Big Government and Big Business.

The site is an open forum and images displayed are not curated, edited, or censored. Anyone is allowed to contribute an image to the forum. Eventually, any image brought to the site will be shown in the random display.

Simmer Down Sprinter
Simmer Down Sprinter is a two-player, sit-down, arcade-style video game that Lambert designed and programmed in which players compete to move runners around a track. The game is controlled by the player's bio-feedback. The more relaxed the player becomes, the faster the runner moves around the track. It is essentially a competitive relaxation.

The game uses what is essentially a polygraph test, as the player rests his or her arm on a metal pad. It senses changes in the users' body temperature and galvanic skin resistance. Exciting warm-up music is played before each game, to make the challenge of keeping calm more difficult.

NY Times Special Edition
Lambert was recently in the news for helping with the organization of the New York Times Special Edition, a hoax edition of 1.2 million copies of the venerable paper that was distributed for free on the streets of New York City. A team of 35 people wrote and edited the paper, including representatives from The Yes Men, CodePINK, and other activist groups. The paper was post-dated for July 4, 2009, several months into President Obama's term, and envisioned a world where the Iraq war was over, Bush and Cheney were tried for war crimes, and congress had passed a maximum wage cap. The stunt created a stir, as many people were temporarily fooled by the otherwise reliable newspaper. The project was honored with the "Award of Distinction Hybrid Art" at Prix Ars Electronica in September 2009.

The Anti Advertising Agency
Steve Lambert founded the AAA in 2004 and has acted as CEO since. The goal of the Anti Advertising Agency is to change the role that advertising has played in our day-to-day lives, an unavoidable nuisance. They believe that through long-term commercial saturation, it has been understood that advertising has the right to occupy and control every inch of available space. Their work calls into question the purpose and effects of advertising in the public space. Using the tools of public relations industries, they constructively parody today's marketing media. The AAA's work ranges from traditional styles (images, stickers, signs, etc.) to more conventional artistic formats (performance, artist books), as well as combinations of the two. It was through this company that Lambert released Add-Art.

Other projects
He has also been a part of another project Wish You Were Here! Postcards From Our Awesome Future. He worked on this project with Packard Jennings and within the project they questioned  "What would you do if you didn't have to worry about budgets, bureaucracy, politics, or physics?" The finished result was a satirical commentary on civil engineering. The project developed into six posters for the Art on Market Street Program. The posters were installed on city streets. All posters are available for use and have been released into the public domain without copyright.

Exhibitions
2009 - (October) Eyebeam Open Studios, New York NY | "Uncommon Ground" - "Uncommon Ground is a sound installation created in collaboration with Victoria Estok. Using stethoscopes against a five by five-foot planter box, people can hear the plant's commentary, discussions, and inner thoughts – which are normally inaudible to human beings. The plants are voiced by comedians and neighbors."

2009 - Charlie James Gallery, Los Angeles CA | "Everything You Want Right Now!" -
"Lambert takes on the vernacular of commercial signage with a regional emphasis unique to Los Angeles. Visually, he is interested in what makes certain styles of signage feel so innately familiar, and in the methods that signage employs to grab our attention."

References

Additional References 
 "Advertising Counterprogramming" by Elise Soukup, Newsweek October 11, 2004
 "Wish You Were Here! Postcards From our Awesome Future." by Steve Lambert and Packard Jennings
 Operation: Anti-Ad by Caitlin Moneypenny-Johnston, Xpress Magazine February 14, 2007
 Web Fight: Blocking Ads and Adding Art by Andrew Adam Newman New York Times, May 14, 2007

External links 
 Steve Lambert Website

American performance artists
American multimedia artists
San Francisco Art Institute alumni
1976 births
Living people
University of California, Davis alumni